This is a list of schools in Bangkok, Thailand.

American School of Bangkok
Ampornpaisarn School
Anglo Singapore International School
Assumption College (Thailand)
Assumption College Thonburi
Bangkok Christian College
Bangkok Christian International School
Bangkok Grace International School
Bangkok Patana School
Bangkok Preparatory International School
Bangpakok Wittayakom School
Bodindecha (Sing Singhaseni) School
Bromsgrove International School Thailand
Centurion International School Bangkok
Concordian International School
Ekamai International School
Enconcept E-Academy
Garden International School Bangkok
Harrow International School, Bangkok
Heathfield International School
Horwang School
International Community School (Thailand)
International School Bangkok
Kasetsart University Laboratory School
KIS International School
Mater Dei School (Thailand)
Nawaminthrachinuthit Bodindecha School
New Sathorn International School
NIST International School
Niva International School
Pan-Asia International School
Patumwan Demonstration School, Srinakharinwirot University
Praht Thai School
Protpittayapayat School
Rajavinit Mathayom School
Ramkhamhaeng Advent International School
The Regent's School
Rittiyawannalai School
Ruamrudee International School
Sacred Heart Convent School (Bangkok)
Samsenwittayalai School
St Andrews International School Bangkok
Saint Gabriel's College
Saint John's Group of Schools
Saint John's International School (Thailand)
St. Mark's International School Bangkok
Sarasas Ektra School
Sarawittaya School
Satriwitthaya 2 School
Shrewsbury International School
Singapore International School of Bangkok
Traimitwitthayalai School
Suankularb Wittayalai School
Suksanari School
Taweethapisek School
Thai-Japanese Association School
Traill International School
Triam Udom Suksa Pattanakarn School
Triam Udom Suksa School
Triamudomsuksapattanakarn Ratchada School
Vajiravudh College
Wat Putthabucha School
Wat Suthiwararam School
Wattana Wittaya Academy
Wells International School
Yothinburana School

See also

List of schools in Thailand
List of universities in Bangkok

External links
Thai Schools directory

 
Bangkok
Schools